Van Ryckeghem is a Belgian surname. Notable people with the surname include:

Daniel Van Ryckeghem (1945–2008), Belgian cyclist
Lars Van Ryckeghem (born 2002), Belgian cyclist
Valérie Van Ryckeghem (born 1975), Belgian golfer
Willy van Ryckeghem (born 1935), Belgian economist

Dutch-language surnames
Surnames of Dutch origin